Munimji is a 1955 Indian Hindi-language romantic comedy film starring Dev Anand and Nalini Jaywant, and directed by Subodh Mukherjee. The story idea was by Ranjan, screenplay was by Nasir Hussain and dialogues by Nasir Hussain and Qamar Jalalabadi. Pran played the villain in the film. It also starred Ameeta and Nirupa Roy. The team of Mukherjee, Nasir Hussain, Dev Anand and music director S.D. Burman later got together to produce another movie, Paying Guest, in 1957. The film was loosely adapted in Telugu as Inti Guttu (1958).

Plot 

Roopa lives a wealthy lifestyle with her widowed dad, Captain Suresh and brother, Shekhar. After she returns from abroad, she is told that she must now prepare to marry her betrothed, Ratan, who is the son of a close friend of Suresh.

Everything changes suddenly when Roopa meets a handsome young man, Raj, and they fall in love with each other. Raj then breaks her heart when he tells her that his mother, Malti, who works as a maidservant in Suresh's household, has always favored Ratan over him and has made him promise to step out of Ratan's way. Before she could find out why Malti prefers Ratan over Raj, a bandit, Kala Ghoda, who has been terrorizing the region, asks Suresh to pay Rs.50,000. The police lay a trap for this extortionist and capture him red-handed. He turns out to be none other than Suresh's Munim. Surprises are in store for everyone when they find out that Munim is Raj, who has been masquerading as the Munim for many years and may have embezzled another Rs.50,000. Now, the questions arise who is Raj? What is his profession? Is he really masquerading as Kala Ghoda?

Cast 
 Dev Anand as Amar / Raj
 Nalini Jaywant as Roopa
 Nirupa Roy as Malti
 Pran as Ratan / Kala Ghoda
 Ameeta as Bela
 Madan Mohan as Shekhar

Soundtrack 
The Music of the film is composed by S. D. Burman and lyrics by Sahir Ludhianvi and Shailendra.

The song "Jeevan Ke Safar Mein Rahi Milte Hai Bichhad Jane Ko," sung by Kishore Kumar, became a super hit.

References

External links 
 
 Munimji on YouTube

1955 films
1950s Hindi-language films
Films scored by S. D. Burman
Hindi films remade in other languages
Indian romantic comedy films
1955 romantic comedy films
Indian black-and-white films